Cochemiea guelzowiana is a species of plant in the family Cactaceae. The species epithet guelzowiana honors the German cactus collector Robert Gülzow of Berlín.

Description
Cochemiea guelzowiana is a perennial plant that grows fleshy, globose, at first solitary and then forming groups. The stems have a spherical,  apically depressed, about 7 inches tall and 4-10 inches in diameter. Tubercules are conical and cylindrical. They do not contain latex. The plant has 1-6  thin central spines, needle shaped, yellowish red,  8 to 25 millimeters long. The 60-80 radial spines are long and twisted, about 15 mm long. The bell-shaped flowers are purple, more or less bright, up to 4 inches long and can reach 7 inches in diameter. The fruits are almost spherical, bright red or yellowish white, about 8 mm in length.

Distribution
This species is endemic to Mexico.

Habitat

References

 Tropicos
 The plant list
 Cacti Guide
 Mammillaria.net
 Urs Eggli, Leonard E. Newton: Etymological Dictionary of Succulent Plant Names. Birkhäuser 2004

guelzowiana
Cacti of Mexico
Endemic flora of Mexico
Flora of Durango
Critically endangered plants
Endangered biota of Mexico
Taxonomy articles created by Polbot